Living with the Law is the debut album by singer-songwriter and guitarist, Chris Whitley. It was released on July 2, 1991.

Malcolm Burn produced, mixed and played on the album. It was co-recorded by Burn and Mark Howard at Kingsway Studio (Daniel Lanois' home) in New Orleans.

Track listing
All tracks written by Chris Whitley.

 "Excerpt" – 0:17
 "Living with the Law" – 3:42
 "Big Sky Country" – 4:45
 "Kick the Stones" – 4:12
 "Make the Dirt Stick" – 3:33
 "Poison Girl" – 3:27
 "Dust Radio" – 5:08
 "Phone Call from Leavenworth" – 4:47
 "I Forget You Every Day" – 4:33
 "Long Way Around" – 4:27
 "Look What Love Has Done" – 3:23
 "Bordertown" – 4:30
 [unnamed] – 0:18

"Living with the Law", "Big Sky Country", and "Poison Girl" were released as singles.

Critical reception
Living with the Law was named ninth best album of 1991 in the Pazz & Jop critics poll. It is also listed in Tom Moon's 2008 book 1,000 Recordings to Hear Before You Die.

Personnel 
Chris Whitley – vocals, National guitar, acoustic guitar, electric guitar, bass guitar
Ronald Jones – drums
Daryl Johnson – bass guitar
Bill Dillon – guitar, pedal steel
Malcolm Burn – keyboards, tambourine

Additional personnel
Peter Conway – harmonica (4)
Alan Gevaert – bass (5)
Daniel Lanois – guitar (6)
Deni Bonet – viola on (6)
Dan Whitley – guitar on (10)

References

1991 debut albums
Chris Whitley albums
Albums produced by Malcolm Burn
Columbia Records albums